Helsinki City Run is an annual half marathon that takes place every May as a road running event around the streets and parks of Helsinki. Starting in 1994 and organised by Suomen Urheiluliitto, the race has become popular over the years, attracting a record number of 17,000 participants in 2013.

See also
 Helsinki City Marathon

References

External links
Official website of Helsinki City Run

Sports competitions in Helsinki
Half marathons
Athletics competitions in Finland
Spring (season) events in Finland
Athletics in Helsinki